There are two species named lined lanternshark:

 Etmopterus bullisi, found the western Atlantic
 Etmopterus dislineatus